

Dinosaurs
 A fossil bone recovered from Cretaceous strata at Woodbury, New Jersey is discussed by the American Philosophical Society in Philadelphia. The remains were only retrospectively identified as dinosaurian, as dinosaurs would not be scientifically recognized as a distinct group of reptiles until Sir Richard Owen presented his treatise on British fossil reptiles to the British Association in August of 1841.

References

18th century in paleontology
Paleontology